Angelo Esposito  (born Casandrino, 14 June 1993) is an Italian rugby union player for Petrarca Padova and the Italian national rugby union team. He normally plays as a winger.

From 2012 to 2021, Esposito played with Italian Pro14 team Benetton.

From 2011 to 2013, Esposito was named in the Italy Under 20 squad. and in the 2011 for the Emerging Italy squad.
In January 2012 he was called up to the Italian team for the 2012 Six Nations Championship.

References

External links
ESPN Profile
It's Rugby France Profile

1993 births
Living people
Italian rugby union players
Italy international rugby union players
Benetton Rugby players
Rugby union wings
Petrarca Rugby players